Francisco Elizondo Garrido born on January 17, 1982, in Mexico City. He is a Mexican politician affiliated to Partido Verde Ecologista de México.

Studies 
Graduated from Universidad Anáhuac from Law studies and obtained a Master's Degree in Constitutional Law from the same university.

Within his courses are:  Labor Metamorfosis , Quality supervision in public work and corrective, preventive and improvement actions.

Experiencia Política 
 2013–Present 
Managing Director of the Communications and Transportation Center in Quintana Roo 
 2011 - 2012
Secretary of Ecology and Environment of the state of Quintana Roo 
 2009 - 2010
Representative of the Partido Verde Ecologista de México before the National Electoral Institute 
 2006 - 2009
Federal Deputy for the PVEM in the LX Legislatura representing the State of Veracruz 
 2003 -  2006
State Delegate of the Partido Verde Ecologista de México

References

1982 births
Living people
Politicians from Veracruz
Ecologist Green Party of Mexico politicians
21st-century Mexican politicians
Universidad Anáhuac México alumni
Members of the Chamber of Deputies (Mexico) for Veracruz